The Dartmouth Group is an early Devonian lithostratigraphic group (a sequence of rock strata) from north and east Cornwall to southeast Devon in southwest England. The name is derived from the port of Dartmouth. The Group comprises (in ascending order i.e. oldest first) the Whitsand Bay and Bin Down formations. The type area is along the southeast coast of Cornwall. The sequence has had various earlier names including the Dartmouth Beds or Slates.

References

Devonian System of Europe
Geology of England
Geological groups of the United Kingdom